Ana Pérez may refer to:

 Ana Pérez (field hockey) (born 1978), Spanish field hockey player
 Ana Pérez (gymnast) (born 1997), Spanish artistic gymnast
 Ana Mercedes Pérez (1910–1994), Venezuelan poet, writer, translator, journalist and diplomat
 Ana Pérez Box (born 1995), Spanish judoka